The Manning Nunataks are a group of nunataks in the eastern side of the southern part of the Amery Ice Shelf, Antarctica, about  north-northeast of Pickering Nunatak. They were photographed from the air by Australian National Antarctic Research Expeditions in 1957, and were named by the Antarctic Names Committee of Australia for Sergeant  A.S. Manning, Royal Australian Air Force, an airframe fitter at Mawson Station in 1958.

See also
Kenneth Ridge
New Year Nunatak

Further reading 
 S.L. Harley, I.C.W. Fitzsimons, Y. Zhao, editors, Antarctica and Supercontinent Evolution, P 102 
 W. F. Budd, M. J. Carry,  T. H. Jacka, Results from the Amery Ice Shelf Project 
 Kim A. Krebs, The Morphology and Dynamics of the Lower Lambert Glacier and Amery Ice Shelf System 
 W. BUDD, 1. LANDON SMITH and E. WISHART, The Amery lee Shelf, P 449

References

Nunataks of Mac. Robertson Land